Antonio di Puccio Pucci (c. 1350 – after 1416) was an Italian architect and politician from the Pucci family.

Life
A member of the Arte dei Legnaioli (woodworkers' guild), he was one of the planned architects on the Loggia della Signoria (1379) in Florence. In 1381 he was examined and declared fit to take up Republican offices in Florence. He rose through the ranks, from Castellan of Frassino (1385) then of Pistoia (1390), then multiple terms as Priore di Libertà (1396 and 1407) then Gonfaloniere di Compagnia (1400, 1405, 1412, 1416). Finally he became a member of the Magistracy of the "XII Buonuomini" (1404 and 1406) then of the Magistracy of the "VIII di Custodia e Balia" (1412). Though in 1412 he was suspected of involvement with the Alberti counts, declared a rebel and exiled, he was pardoned around 1416, when he took up office as castellan of Torre di Sant’Alberto and Casseretto ad Arezzo.

Marriage and issue
He married twice:
in 1384, to Bartolomea del Giocondo, with the following issue
Puccio Pucci, founder of the main Pucci noble line.
Giovanni, politician
Niccolò, Servite monk
in 1401, to Lucia Orlandini, with the following issue
Benintendi, politician
Saracino, founder of the marchionate Pucci line, with the three branches admitted to the Florentine Patriciate in 1752
Piero, ally of Cosimo the Elder
Ghita
Lucrezia
Giovanna

1350s births
15th-century deaths
Architects from Florence
Antonio
Politicians from Florence
14th-century people of the Republic of Florence